Olive Township is the name of two townships in Indiana:
Olive Township, Elkhart County, Indiana
Olive Township, St. Joseph County, Indiana

Indiana township disambiguation pages